Line 29 of the Shenzhen Metro is a line under planning, which will connect the districts of Nanshan, Bao'an and Guangming for 30.6 kilometers and 24 stations. Construction is planned to begin in 2023. The first phase of Line 29 has entered Phase V planning, and will run from Hongshuwan South in Nanshan District to Xingdong in Bao'an District, with 10 stations and 11.3 kilometers of track. The line is proposed to use 6 car type B trains.

Stations (Phase 1)

References

Shenzhen Metro lines
Transport infrastructure under construction in China